The Arena Jacques Plante was a 2,524-seat (total capacity 3,700) multi-purpose arena in Shawinigan, Quebec, Canada. It was built in 1937. It was home to the Shawinigan Cataractes Ice hockey team.  The arena is named in honour of Jacques Plante; formerly, the building was known as the Shawinigan Municipal Auditorium. In 2008, the building was closed in favour of the new Centre Bionest located adjacent to the Arena Jacques Plante.

References

Indoor ice hockey venues in Quebec
Defunct indoor arenas in Canada
Sports venues in Quebec
Quebec Major Junior Hockey League arenas
Buildings and structures in Shawinigan